Lü Wei (1966 – 9 May 1990) was a Chinese diver who competed in women's 10-metre platform.

Career
She was the gold medalist at the 1982 Asian Games, 1983 Summer Universiade, 1985 Summer Universiade, 1986 Asian Games, and 1987 Summer Universiade.

She missed the 1984 Summer Olympics due to an injury. (Her replacement Zhou Jihong won the Olympic gold medal.)

Murder
Lü Wei was murdered in 1990 along with her friend, Peking opera artist Xun Linglai, in Xun's home. Lü was then working for the sports bureau in her hometown of Yangzhou, and was on a business trip to Beijing, where Xun lived. The case remains unsolved.

See also
List of unsolved murders

References 

1966 births
1990 deaths
Asian Games gold medalists for China
Asian Games medalists in diving
Chinese female divers
Chinese murder victims
Divers at the 1982 Asian Games
Divers at the 1986 Asian Games
Female murder victims
Medalists at the 1982 Asian Games
Medalists at the 1983 Summer Universiade
Medalists at the 1985 Summer Universiade
Medalists at the 1986 Asian Games
Medalists at the 1987 Summer Universiade
People murdered in Beijing
Sportspeople from Jiangsu
Sportspeople from Yangzhou
Universiade gold medalists for China
Universiade medalists in diving
Unsolved murders in China
20th-century Chinese women